The Carmel Arts and Crafts Club was an art gallery, clubhouse founded in 1905, by Elsie Allen, a former art instructor for Wellesley College. The club was located at Monte Verde Street in Carmel-by-the-Sea, California, where the Golden Bough Playhouse is today. The clubhouse served as the Carmel community cultural center. It held dramatic performances, poetry readings, lectures, and was a summer school for the arts. Between 1919 and 1948 Carmel was the largest art colony on the Pacific coast.

History

Many of the local artists living in the area got together and formed a club that became the Carmel Arts and Crafts Club. Their first meeting was held at the home of Elsie Allen in 1905. The club was established to attract artists to the art colony that became Carmel-by-the-Sea, California. Allen was elected president, Jane Powers, wife of Frank Hubbard Powers as vice president, Louis S. Slevin as treasurer, and Mary Braley as secretary. Josephine K. Foster was elected president on September 4, 1906. The club was incorporated under the name of Arts and Crafts Club of Carmel. Activities held at the club included dances, card parties, plays, lectures, music recitals, and art exhibitions. The club sponsored summer classes for artists.

In 1906, the Carmel Development Company provided the club with their first building on Ocean Avenue. Their first art exhibit was held in this temporary building. Foster formed a committee to raise money to build a permanent site for the clubhouse. It raised money by holding a "Dutch Market" with booths to sell goods and food at the park across the Hotel Carmelo. Those in charge of the booths were: George Sterling's wife, Sydney J. Yard's wife, Michael J. Murphy's wife, and others. Sinclair Lewis acted as master of ceremonies. By July 1907, a lot and the clubhouse building costing $2,500 was completed on Monte Verde Street south of Eighth Avenue.

Every summer Jennie V. Cannon travelled to the Monterey Peninsula, and in 1907 purchased real estate in Carmel, where she joined the local art colony, participated in its birth and development, and exhibited at the Carmel Arts and Crafts Club.

Harold Sutton Palmer spoke at the club in March 1907 as well as musical selections by Mabel Gray Lachmund, Peral Tuttle, Sallie Ehrmann, and a reading by Fanny M. Yard, wife of watercolor artist Sydney J. Yard. Her husband, Sydney Yard exhibited at the club as well. Other early events included the Café-chantant and bazar to raise funds to pay for an art exhibition held at the clubhouse; entertainment for the Manzanita Club, which included music and dancing followed by dinner and speeches.

On July 16, 1908, the first annual breakfast of the Club was held at the clubhouse. George Sterling was toastmaster for thirty-two members of the club. Mary E. Hand was introduced as president of the club, which she held for sixteen years.

On September 24, 1911, the Club put on the play The Land of Heart's Desire, produced by Herbert Heron, at the Forest Theater amphitheater in Carmel. From July 4-5th 1916, the Club presented The Piper, by Josephine Preston Peabody at the Forest Theater. Four Carmel artists acted and painted scenery: Arthur Honywood Vachell, Mary DeNeale Morgan, William F. Ritschel, and Laura Maxwell.

Percy Gray Gray was very active in the Carmel art colony, often staying for several months at a time, and exhibiting with the Carmel Arts and Crafts Club (1913, 1923) and the Carmel Art Association (1927-1928, 1932-1943). William Frederic Ritschel exhibited at the Carmel Arts and Crafts Club between 1913 and 1924 and continued as a frequent exhibiting member for more than two decades at the Carmel Art Association, where he received numerous awards and served as president and on the board of directors. John O'Shea relocated to Carmel In 1917, and frequently exhibited at the Carmel Arts and Crafts Club.

The last exhibition held by the Club was the Eighteenth Exhibition from September–October 1924. The art community saw a decline in the sale of paintings.

In April 1927, the deed to the clubhouse was sold to the Abalone League and the proceeds were used to pay off the Forest Theater debts.

Arts and Crafts Theater

Mary Hand, president, helped build the Carmel Arts and Crafts Theater in 1922, where the Club put on their own theatrical productions. The formal opening of the Arts and Crafts Theater was highlighted by the performance of two plays produced by John Northern Hilliard, The Thrice Promised Bride and The Queen's Enemies.

Real estate developer Byington Ford and his wife Ruth, were active in the Abalone League productions at the Arts and Crafts Theater. Orginal drams by local playwrights as Martin Flavin, Perry Newberry, and Ira Remsen were produced in the Arts and Crafts Theater at that time. 

The play The Bad Man, a three-act comedy by American playwright Porter Emerson Browne, was put on by the Arts and Crafts Theater on January 15, 1926. Artist Jo Mora, Byington Ford, and other Abalone Players were among the actors in the play.

Other plays put on by the Arts and Crafts Theater were The Copperhead, Is Zat So, Cinderella, Doubling in Brass, Captain Brassbound's Conversion, Children Of The Moon, Clarence, In His Arms, One Of The Family, and What Happened to Jones.

Forest Theater

To help raise funds to pay off the Arts and Crafts Theater debts, and avoid the competing Forest Theater, the two groups decided to merge in 1924, into the Forest Theater Corporation, as a unifying entity to produce and manage plays staged at the Forest Theater.

Carmel Summer School Of Art

In 1910, the Club established a Carmel Summer School Of Art, with Yard as director, to teach drama, painting, pottery, metalwork and a variety of other crafts. The school's instructors included Mary DeNeale Morgan from 1917-1925; William Merritt Chase, in 1914, a former director of the London School of Art; Josephine Culbertson, Ida A. Johnson, Helene Woods Smith, of Pratt Institute in Brooklyn; Jo Mora from 1922-1926; Paul K. Mays of the Provincetown Printers and the Art Students League of New York. Morgan settled in Carmel in 1909, became the director of the School and Club.

From July through September 1914 William Merritt Chase taught his last summer class, his largest with over one hundred pupils, at the Summer School Of Art. His former student, Jennie V. Cannon, in conjunction with Chase's business manager Channel Pickering Townsley and Carmel's co-founder James Franklin Devendorf, persuaded the painter to visit the Pacific Coast. Several of the Carmel students published descriptions of his lectures and teaching methods. Chase found the art colony at Carmel too confining socially and moved his residence to the nearby Hotel Del Monte in Monterey. In mid-August one of his students, Helena Wood Smith, was brutally murdered by her Japanese lover, which caused the cancellation of several classes, near violent hysteria in the art colony, and the early departure of some of his students. Chase continued with his regular teaching schedule, held meetings with important regional artists, such as William Ritschel, painted several local scenes, and experimented with monotypes.

Legacy

By September 1927, the Carmel Art Association replaced the Arts and Crafts Club and became the center of the art community on the Monterey Peninsula.

An Arts & Crafts scrapbook, produced by the Carmel Arts and Crafts Club, chronicles the activities of Carmel's Arts and Crafts Club from 1912 to 1926. The scrapbook contains pamphlets, photographs, articles and letters documenting the Club's summer school, annual art shows, theater productions and other activities.

Exhibitions

The clubhouse staged annual and special exhibitions, which attracted visiting artists from across the country, and provided professional instruction in painting, sculpture, and crafts.

Exhibitors
Below is a partial list of exhibitors at the club.  For a complete list see Exhibitors of the Carmel Arts and Crafts Club (1906-1924).

Publications
 Jennie V. Cannon: The Untold History of the Carmel and Berkeley Art Colonies, Volume 1, by Robert W. Edwards, 2012
 Arts and Crafts Club of Carmel: Arts and Crafts Club Scrapbook

References

External links
 
 Carmel Art Association website
 Traditional Find Arts Organization and CAA

Arts organizations established in 1905
Art in California
Art museums and galleries in California
American artist groups and collectives
Arts organizations disestablished in the 20th century
1905 establishments in California